Shenanigans is the debut extended play by the American punk rock band Squirtgun. It was released on June 9, 1995 through Lookout! Records. Shenanigans features slightly different versions of the songs "Social" and "Frederick's Frost", which later appeared on the group's debut studio album, Squirtgun. The version of "Social" on Shenanigans was used in the opening credits of the Kevin Smith film Mallrats in 1995.

Track listing
"Social" - 3:35
"Frederick's Frost" - 1:35
"Giddy and Glum" - 2:37
"Almost the Girl" - 2:44

Personnel
 Mass Giorgini - bass, producer
 Flav Giorgini - guitar
 Matt Hart - guitar, vocals
 Dan Lumley - drums

1995 debut EPs
Squirtgun albums
Lookout! Records EPs